Indika may refer to:
 An alternate name of Megasthenes' Indica

People
 Indika Anuruddha, Sri Lankan politician
 Indika Bandaranayake (b. 1972), Sri Lankan politician
 Indika Basnayake (b. 1979), Sri Lankan cricketer
 Indika Batuwitarachchi (b. 1974), Sri Lankan cricketer
 Indika de Saram (b. 1972), Sri Lankan cricketer
 Indika Dissanayake (b. 1989), Sri Lankan weightlifter
 Indika Gallage (b. 1975), Sri Lankan cricketer
 Indika Gunawardena (1943–2015), Sri Lankan politician
 Indika Kankanange (b. 1974), Sri Lankan cricketer
 Indika Ruwanpura (b. 1980), Sri Lankan cricketer
 Damith Indika (b. 1984), Sri Lankan cricketer
 Iran Indika (b. 1989), Sri Lankan cricketer
 Nuwan Indika (b. 1985), Sri Lankan cricketer
 Wehella Kankanamge Indika, Sri Lankan politician

See also
Indica (disambiguation)

Sinhalese surnames
Sinhalese unisex given names